The Brisbane River Classic ('BRC') is a yearly fishing tournament held on the Brisbane River in Brisbane, Queensland, Australia. It is held usually in November or December each year and is the only fishing tournament to be held on the Brisbane River. The 2008 tournament saw the changing of the Longest Shark and Longest Catfish categories, into Photo and Release categories. The other categories are Longest Bream, Best Miscellaneous and Junior BRC (Best Miscellaneous). The 2009 tournament saw the introduction of a new category, Longest King Threadfin.

The tournament sparked debate in the 2007 Brisbane River Classic fishing tournament with the winning entry for the Heaviest Shark a record-sized 2.9m bull shark. It is believed that the shark was the largest caught in the river. It was weighed but the scales registered to only 200 kg and is estimated to have been 250 kg to 300 kg. The tournament has now introduced Photo and Release entry methods.

BRC trophies and awards

BRC results

References

External links
 Brisbane Fishing Online — event organisers;
 Courier Mail News Article
 Fishing Monthly News Article

Fishing tournaments
Brisbane River
Sport in Brisbane
Recreational fishing in Australia